Africa No Filter (ANF) is a not-for-profit organization.

Executive Director 
Moky Makura is a thought leader and narrative and communications expert with a wealth of experience gained from over 25 years in the Communications industry. She took up her role as Executive Director in March 2020.

Grantmaking 
ANF grants support emerging and established artists, scholars, authors, poets, bloggers, vloggers, photographers, curators, publishers, musicians, journalists, and arts, culture and media organizations based in Africa and the diaspora who are challenging stereotypes about Africa through their work. Grants are offered directly and indirectly through intermediaries to individuals and organizations based in Africa and the Diaspora.

Operational Support Grants 
Operational Support Grants are open to creative hubs, narrative change organizations, media houses, festivals, galleries, digital platforms, etc., who are supporting individual storytellers. This can be through program delivery, job creation, residences, networking opportunities, training and capacity building creatives, artists, journalists etc.

Capacity Building Grants 
Capacity Building Grants support the delivery of upskilling and training projects on the continent. Funding supports individuals and organizations using traditional and new media, art, innovation, tech, and creativity to challenge stereotypical narratives about Africa.

Convening Grants 
Convening Grants are open to organizations and individuals that organize forums, debates, panel discussions, and dialogues with African and diaspora speakers - including young people and subject matter experts - to generate insights on things that shape perceptions about Africa.

ANF Research 
Africa No Filter produces evidence-based insights on the impact of the current stereotypical narratives on the continent's development. The ANF Research Consortium consists of Facebook, AUDA-NEPAD, the African Union Commission, and The Africa Centre in New York.

Research Reports 
ANF’s work is underpinned by continuous research on the impact of current stereotypical narratives on Africa’s development. ANF reports include How African Media Covers Africa, which surveyed 38 African editors and analyzed content from 60 African news outlets in 15 countries between September and October 2020. In addition, four facilitated focus groups were held with 25 editors of African media, editors of Pan African outlets and international correspondents. Results found that 63% of outlets surveyed didn’t have correspondents in other African countries, 1/3 of all coverage on Africa was from non-African sources, and that 81% of the stories analyzed were conflicts and crises. Africa No Filter launched bird - the continent’s first and only news agency focusing on stories of creativity, innovation, arts & culture, and human interest - in response to findings from the report.

Fellows Programs 
ANF also has research and arts programs that work with and support cohorts of narrative changemakers.

Emerging Artists Fellows Program 
The Emerging Artists Fellows Program will provide 12 exceptional creative practitioners from across Africa with mentorship, peer to peer skills sharing and new networks through monthly fellow-led seminars.

How to Write About Africa in 8 Steps: An ethical storytelling handbook 
Development funders, the media and western storytellers typically portray themselves as white saviors who heroically rescue Africa from war and hunger, stirring up pity for Africans by leaving out the stories about the agency of communities and individuals to solve their challenges.

References 

Non-profit organizations based in Africa